The W0KIE Satellite Radio Network was a mostly talk radio network, listenable via C-band satellite.  It operated, almost continuously, from 1996 to 2007.  (It was named after the amateur radio callsign of its owner.)

The programming was of a less structured nature than traditional talk radio.  There was special emphasis on programming for amateur radio operators, satellite TV enthusiasts and the sight impaired.

Although not the primary focus of the network, some show hosts did play music—a lot of which was not heard on traditional radio. Comedy and plays—old and new—were also often featured.

The format was reminiscent of free-form programming heard during the formative years of FM radio.

History
5 April 1996W0KIE was born on SBS6 Ku-band transponder 13b (12031 MHz) originating via POTS extended fidelity audio feed to the Creek Nation Bingo uplink in Tulsa, Oklahoma.  W0KIE uplinked nightly during a 1-hour window (2 bingo games on the video carrier) and a 1/2 hour window (1 bingo game on the video carrier.)
18 June 1996Houston AMSAT Net  joins the W0KIE Network.
Summer 1998W0KIE uplink moves to Indian bingo uplink in Concho, Oklahoma north of El Reno, Oklahoma.  The uplink signal quality would vary at times when the Oklahoma wind rocked the uplink dish.
7 December 1998W0KIE moves to GE-1 (W1) on the Wisdom Network video carrier, Transponder 12B, 5.7 MHz audio. Uplinking starts around the clock from Bluefield, WV.  Audio to uplink using RealAudio encoding via POTS dialup greatly improving audio fidelity. W0KIE retransmitted in FM band spectrum on TCI cable in Tulsa.  Satellite air permit obtained from BMI and ASCAP and several Tulsa FM stations.
7 November 2000W0KIE moves to Satcom C3, Transponder 24, 7.5 MHz audio at a TCI/AT&T uplink in Denver on the Oxygen Network video carrier.  Audio to uplink using a Gentner frequency extender via POTS dialup.  W0KIE begins airing a barker advertising feed for the Oxygen Network on 6.8 MHz using a Sony rack mounted mini disc player.
15 October 2001W0KIE moves to GE7 (now known as AMC7), C-band transponder 5, 7.5 MHz wide audio on the Denver FOX video carrier.
Spring 2004POTS line digital codec units are obtained, bringing a further improvement in fidelity and reliability over the aging and ailing frequency extender
Spring 2005The uplink feed is moved to Vyvx (now Level 3) in Denver.  Policy at the new location allows internet access via DSL.  A computer is installed to carry even higher fidelity audio to the subcarrier.
Summer 2005Another subcarrier becomes available.  W0KIE is now stereo!
8 December 2005W0KIE moves to Intelsat Americas 6 (IA6, aka T6) 93°W, C-band analog, transponder 1, 6.2 and 6.8 MHz wide band audio on an encrypted adult channel video carrier.  IA6 is now known as Galaxy 26.
13 December 2006W0KIE begins Digicipher feed on AMC 3 (W3) at 87 deg. W. C band, Transponder 7, virtual channel 958 in stereo on a digital ABC - New York and CBS - Erie video carrier.
31 October 2007 at 23:12 CDTThe television service on T6 tr 1 ceases—W0KIE's analogue audio channels move to transponder 7 on the same satellite for the month of November 2007.
November 2007Digicipher feed on AMC 3, is dropped.
1 December 2007 at 10:11 CSTThe television service on T6 tr 7 ceases—leaving W0KIE Radio absent from satellite.

Demise 
In the wake of the decline of C band listeners in general and personal considerations, the owner of W0KIE chose to put the network to rest, and return his callsign to exclusive ham radio use. As of 1 December 2007, W0KIE Satellite Radio Network is off the air, permanently.

A contingent of W0KIE programmers went on to form the SkyScanner Satellite Radio Network (named in honour of the late Dean Spratt), buying airtime on Access America (a DVB audio channel, on Galaxy 25 (aka T5) 97.0°W Ku-band). This arrangement was dissolved in January 2012, leaving the group's presence in the hands of Radio Free Dishnuts—an internet-only radio service.

External links
Radio Free Dishnuts & SkyScanner home page

Defunct radio networks in the United States
Satellite radio stations
Radio stations established in 1996 
Radio stations disestablished in 2007
Defunct radio stations in the United States